Nancy J. Pinkin is an American Democratic Party politician, who has been the County Clerk of Middlesex County, New Jersey since 2021, before which she served in the New Jersey General Assembly from 2014 to 2020 where she represented the 18th Legislative District.

Early life 
Pinkin served on the East Brunswick Township Council 2005 to 2014, including a two-year term as Council President. She also served three years on the East Brunswick Planning Board. Pinkin runs her own healthcare and association management consulting firm, Pinkin Associates, Inc., and has an extensive background in healthcare administration, with an expertise in ambulatory care and medical practice management. She is also the Executive Director of the Middlesex and Mercer County Medical Societies. She received an associates degree from Middlesex County College in Applied Science, a Bachelor of Science degree from Rutgers University, and holds a Master of Public Administration with a specialization in health administration from New York University. She completed a postgraduate fellowship in Health Policy and Research at UMDNJ where she also served as health policy advisor to then-State Senator Jack Sinagra. Pinkin resigned her seat on December 31, 2020, to become the Middlesex County clerk.

New Jersey Assembly 
Pinkin was elected to the Assembly in 2013, and then again in 2015 alongside Patrick J. Diegnan. She was re-elected to the Assembly in 2017 alongside Robert Karabinchak. She has served as Deputy Speaker Pro-Tempore since 2018.

Committees 
Environment and Solid Waste, Chair
Health and Senior Services
Law and Public Safety
New Jersey Legislative Select Oversight

District 18 
Each of the forty districts in the New Jersey Legislature has one representative in the New Jersey Senate and two members in the New Jersey General Assembly. The other representatives from the 18th District for the 2014-2015 Legislative Session are:
Senator Patrick J. Diegnan (D)
Assemblyman Robert Karabinchak (D)

Electoral history

New Jersey Assembly

References

External links
 
Nancy J. Pinkin (D) - New Jersey Legislature bio page

Living people
Democratic Party members of the New Jersey General Assembly
People from East Brunswick, New Jersey
Place of birth missing (living people)
Politicians from Middlesex County, New Jersey
New Jersey city council members
Women city councillors in New Jersey
21st-century American politicians
21st-century American women politicians
Middlesex County College alumni
1952 births